Rebecca Faye Clark (born 10 October 1960), known as Rebecca Pow, is a British politician serving as Parliamentary Under-Secretary of State for Environmental Quality and Resilience since October 2022. She served as Parliamentary Under-Secretary of State at the Department for Environment, Food and Rural Affairs from 2019 to 2022. A member of the Conservative Party, she has served as the Member of Parliament for Taunton Deane since 2015.

Early life 

Pow was born in the county of Somerset in South West England.

Education 

After attending Priston village school, Pow continued her education at La Sainte Union Convent in Bath. Pow studied Rural Environment Studies at Wye College, University of London.

Personal life 

Pow was brought up on a farm in Inglesbatch near Bath, working there throughout her teenage years. She was an active member of both Bath and Taunton Young Farmers Clubs where she met her late husband, Charles Clark. They were married for 27 years until his death in 2019, and had 3 children together.

Pre-parliamentary career 

Pow was a Governor at Thurlbear C of E school for 10 years and a Parish Councillor in her local village, Stoke St Mary.

She had a career in radio and television, including working for HTV in Bristol and BBC Radio 4. Pow also ran the Taste of Somerset, the first independent initiative for local food and drink producers which ultimately became The Taste of the West. In 2003 Pow took voluntary redundancy from ITV West to set up Pow Productions, specialising in communications and PR focusing on the rural environment, farming, food and gardening.

Political career 

Standing for election to Parliament for the first time in May 2015, Pow became the MP for Taunton Deane with a majority of 15,491 votes (26.8% of the vote). In July 2016, Pow was made Parliamentary Private Secretary (PPS) to Gavin Barwell MP, Minister for Housing, Planning and Minister for London in the Department for Communities and Local Government (DCLG). Pow supported the Conservative Government's moves to cap welfare, improve education and opportunities for young people, control immigration and deal with the deficit. She described herself as "a traditional Conservative with a twist of the contemporary with [her] own added touch of green!" Pow was selected at an Open Primary held in Taunton in July 2013. It was the first time a candidate had been selected for the constituency in this way, with the audience voting. She was also the first female Conservative MP to represent Taunton Deane. She declared that she would vote Remain in the 2016 referendum on the UK's membership of the EU.

Pow was previously a parish councillor for Stoke St Mary and trustee of the Somerset Wildlife Trust. After working for the National Farmers Union, she became a journalist specialising in environment, farming and gardening and has reported for BBC, ITV and Channel 4. She stepped down as vice-president of Somerset Wildlife Trust in June 2018, following an online petition criticising her support for badger culling.

During the 2015–17 Parliament, Pow sat on the Environmental Audit Select Committee and Environment, Food and Rural Affairs Select Committee. She declared that she would vote Remain in the 2016 referendum on the UK's membership of the EU.

After Theresa May called the 2017 general election, Pow announced she would seek reelection as MP for Taunton Deane. On 8 June 2017, she was returned as Member of Parliament for Taunton Deane. Whilst her vote share increased by 4.8% the local Lib Dem candidate's vote increased by 6.3% – so Pow's majority slipped from 26.8% to 25.2%.

Pow received local and national criticism for stating during the 2017 Budget debate that people in Taunton have "thousands of extra pounds in their pockets.

In 2018, Pow was awarded a Green Heart Hero Award by The Climate Coalition, a coalition of over 100 charities and community groups across the UK, for being the "Greenest New MP" for her environmental work. A constituent recognising the award nevertheless criticised Pow's record on low carbon measures. Pow served as a Parliamentary Private Secretary (PPS) to the Department for Environment, Food and Rural Affairs Ministerial team, before serving as PPS to Secretary of State for Work and Pensions Esther McVey until her Ministerial appointment in May 2019.

In May 2019, it was alleged that Pow was one of a number of MPs who had legally claimed parliamentary expenses for an 'accommodation uplift' contrary to the measures original purpose.

In 2019, during the second May ministry, Pow was appointed Parliamentary Under Secretary of State for Arts, Heritage and Tourism at the Department for Digital, Culture, Media and Sport.

On 10 September 2019, during the first Johnson ministry, Pow was appointed Parliamentary Under-Secretary of State at the Department for Environment, Food and Rural Affairs. Her ministerial portfolio included the domestic natural environment, climate change adaptation, land use and floods and water. She resigned from this position on 7 July 2022, as part of the July 2022 United Kingdom government crisis.

References

External links 
 Official website
 
 

1960 births
Living people
21st-century British journalists
Conservative Party (UK) MPs for English constituencies
Female members of the Parliament of the United Kingdom for English constituencies
UK MPs 2015–2017
UK MPs 2017–2019
UK MPs 2019–present
21st-century British women politicians
Politicians from Somerset
21st-century British farmers
21st-century English women politicians
21st-century English politicians
Alumni of Wye College